And Do They Do/Zoo Caprices is the eighth album released by Michael Nyman and the fifth featuring the Michael Nyman Band.  And Do They Do is a modern dance work commission by Siobhan Davies and The London Contemporary Dance Theatre, which premiered at Sadler's Wells Theatre on 25 November 1986.  Zoo Caprices is a multi-stop violin solo for Alexander Balanescu based on the score for Peter Greenaway's film, A Zed & Two Noughts.

The album was issued on LP in 1986 by Ter Records under license from Jay Records.  It was issued on compact disc first in 1989 by Ter Records, which had released A Zed & Two Noughts.  Jay Records then reissued the album on CD on 15 June 1999.

And Do They Do
And Do They Do consists of four linked "Songs" (although none of them are actually sung), that were used for  Siobhan Davies's dance production, which the album photos suggest was done entirely in the nude.  (The back cover of the booklet shows male full frontal nudity.)  However, production photos and a video recording of the first performance in 1987 show that the dancers were fully clothed. The album cover art appears to have been taken from the stage design artwork for the play. The third song, although it has the jazziest qualities, is based on Robert Schumann's Nachtlied Opus 19, No.1, a "spin-off" from his opera, The Man Who Mistook His Wife for a Hat, which was written concurrently and in which Schumann's music is an important element of the story.

Zoo Caprices
Zoo Caprices was written for the virtuosity of Alexander Balanescu, who premiered the work in Paris on 8 April 1986.  The score is a reduction of the score for A Zed & Two Noughts, but allows for Balanescu's ability to create multiple harmonies on a single instrument through multiple stops.  The order is significantly altered from the original album, and "Vermeer's Wife" and "Prawn Watching" are combined into a single section.

Track listing
Song I
Song II
Song III
Song IV
The Lady in the Red Hat
Swan Rot
Up for Crabs
Car Crash
Bisocosis Populi
Venus de Milo
Angelfish Decay
Vermeer's Wife Watches Prawns
Timelapse

Personnel
Performed by the Michael Nyman Band
Alexander Balanescu, violin
Rupert Bawden, viola
Andrew Findon, piccolo, bass flute
David Fuest, clarinet, bass clarinet
Michael Nyman, piano
Elisabeth Perry, violin
Ruth Phillips, cello
David Roach, alto, tenor saxophone
And Do They Do recorded at Abbey Road Studios, London
Engineer:  John Kurlander
Zoo Caprices recorded at The Michael Nyman Studio
Produced by David Cunningham
Post production: Nova Studios
Digital editing at Finesplice Studios
Editing engineer: Ben Turner
Mastered by Tim Young at CBS Studios
Photography and cover design by David Buckland
Album release co-oridnation: David Stoner
Executive Producer: Gordon Yap

References

1980s classical albums
Michael Nyman albums